The 2017–18 UC Irvine Anteaters men's basketball team represented the University of California, Irvine during the 2017–18 NCAA Division I men's basketball season. The Anteaters were led by eighth-year head coach Russell Turner and played heir home games at the Bren Events Center as members of the Big West Conference. They finished the season 18–17, 11–5 in Big West play to finish in a tie for second place. As the No. 3 seed in the Big West tournament, they defeated Hawaii and UC Santa Barbara before losing to Cal State Fullerton in the championship game.

Previous season 
The Anteaters finished the 2016–17 season 21–15, 12–4 in Big West play to win the regular season Big West championship, the school's fifth regular season title. They defeated UC Riverside in the quarterfinals of the Big West tournament and the Long Beach State in the semifinals before falling to UC Davis in the championship game. As a regular season champion who did not win their conference tournament, the Anteaters received an automatic bid to the National Invitation Tournament as a No. 8 seed. There, they lost to No. 1 seed Illinois State in the first round. The season marked the school's fifth straight season with at least 20 wins.

Offseason

Departures

2017 recruiting class

Roster

Schedule and results

|-
!colspan=9 style=|  Exhibition

|-
!colspan=9 style=| Non-conference regular season

|-
!colspan=9 style=| Big West regular season

|-
!colspan=9 style=| Big West tournament

Source

References

UC Irvine
UC Irvine Anteaters men's basketball seasons
UC Irvine Anteaters
UC Irvine Anteaters